The Tokyo International Anime Fair also known as  was one of the largest anime trade fairs in the world, held annually in Tokyo, Japan. The first event was held in 2002 as "Tokyo International Anime Fair 21". The event was held at Tokyo Big Sight, a convention and exhibition center in Tokyo Bay, in late March. Usually, the first one or two days of the fair were weekdays and the entrance was open only to industry members and the press; the last two days were scheduled on the weekend and the fair was open to the public.

Besides being an international trade fair, the TAF included related events such as business symposia and other events. Notably, the Tokyo Anime Awards were given for domestic and foreign creations and creators in the event with the name of the event. The event was supported by the Bureau of Industrial and Labor Affairs of Tokyo. Although the event did not have a long history, it and its prizes were recognized in the industry. In 2014, it was merged with the Anime Contents Expo to form AnimeJapan.

Event history
This table shows the number of visitors and participants:

Official theme song

2011 event

In December 2010 a group of ten large manga publishers known as the  announced plans to boycott the 2011 event. The boycott was in protest at revisions to the Tokyo Youth Development Ordinance that increased regulation of manga and anime sales to under-18 year olds. This was seen as a deliberate snub of Shintaro Ishihara, who was closely associated with both TAF and the changes to the law. Japanese Prime Minister Naoto Kan had expressed concern about the impact of the boycott and urged the parties involved to work towards resolving the situation.

Due to the devastating earthquake and tsunami that hit the northeast coast of Japan on March 11, 2011, it was announced five days later, that the 2011 event would be canceled. In addition, Tokyo Big Sight, where the event was held annually, suffered unspecified damage during the quake in the Tokyo area.

References

External links

Tokyo International Anime Fair official site (Japanese)
Tokyo International Anime Fair official site (English)

Convention reports
"Tokyo International Anime Fair", by Jon Tarbox, Anime News Network, 3 April 2003 
"Tokyo International Anime Fair 2006", by Kat Avila, Sequential Tart, April 2006
"The Award for Best Satanic Rabbit Goes to …,", by Virginia Heffernan, New York Times, 2 April 2006
"Tokyo International Anime Fair 2010 at Tokyo Big Sight", by Kanako, musicJAPANplus, Tokyo, 6 April 2010

2002 establishments in Japan
2013 disestablishments in Japan
Defunct anime conventions
Recurring events established in 2002
Recurring events disestablished in 2013
Annual events in Japan
Culture in Tokyo
Trade fairs in Japan
Tourist attractions in Tokyo